Vittorio Cosma (born 11 March 1965) is an Italian pianist, record producer, conductor, and arranger.

Life and career 
Born in Varese, Cosma studied piano at the Milan Conservatory and later jazz piano under Patrizio Fariselli and Franco D'Andrea. He made his professional debut as keyboardist in the bands Volpini Volanti and Premiata Forneria Marconi, with whom he made four tours and recorded Miss Baker. 

His activities as composer, arranger, and producer began in the late 1980s for Eugenio Finardi's album Il vento di Elora. He also curated several compilation albums of jazz and fusion music, and composed scores for films, TV series, and commercials.

Cosma is a longtime collaborator with the musical group Elio e le Storie Tese. His collaborations also include Pino Daniele, Ornella Vanoni, Renato Zero, Ivano Fossati, Stewart Copeland, Roberto Vecchioni, Ricchi e Poveri, Mike Francis, Enrico Ruggeri, Teresa De Sio, Nino Buonocore, Grazia Di Michele.

In 2017 he recorded an album as a member of the supergroup Gizmodrome with Stewart Copeland, Adrian Belew, and Mark King.

References

External links 

 
 

1965 births
Living people 
Musicians from Varese
Italian keyboardists
Italian male composers
Italian male songwriters
Italian record producers
Italian music arrangers
Milan Conservatory alumni
Gizmodrome members
Eurovision Song Contest conductors